Andrew Deutsch (born 1968) is a sound artist who also teaches at the New York State College of Ceramics at Alfred University.

Life and work
Deutsch was born in Keene, NH, and received his BFA in Video Art and Printmaking from Alfred University in 1990. He obtained his MFA in Integrated Electronic Art from Rensselaer Polytechnic Institute in 1994. Since 1998 Deutsch has released over 14 CDRs of solo electronic music on his Magic If Recordings label. Each Magic If edition showcases his experimental music and graphic art and is distributed exclusively in the United States by Anomalous Records.

He has collaborated with various artists, including: Harald Bode (posthumously), Tetsu Inoue, Pauline Oliveros, Ann Hamilton, Joseph Nechvatal, Tony Conrad and Stephen Vitiello. His collaborative piece Empty Words 4 with John Cage and Yvar Mikshoff has been accepted into the limited archives of the John Cage Trust. There are re-mixes of Deutsch's CD Garden Music on Oval’s OvalProcess, and Microstoria’s Improvisers.

In 1998 Deutsch formed Carrier Band with Peer Bode and Pauline Oliveros, producing the recordings Carrier and Automatic Inscription of Speech Melody. Deutsch is also a regular collaborator with Peer Bode and Jessie Shefrin on both sound and video projects. Deutsch is the recipient of an Artists Fellowship in Video Art (1997) from the New York Foundation for the Arts and a Special Opportunity Stipend from the New York Foundation for the Arts (1999).

Deutsch has also made video work at the Experimental Television Center in Owego, NY. Deutsch's The Sun was listed as "best of 2005 in music" by Artforum Magazine. He has audio work released by Anomalous Records, Institute for Electronic Arts, and Deep Listening, all of which can be found at Forced Exposure.

Deutsch is a member of the Institute for Electronic Art at Alfred University and the Pauline Oliveros Foundation Board of Advisors. Deutsch is a former member of the Pauline Oliveros Foundation Board of Directors (1999 - 2001).

Since 2010 Deutsch has produced 3 hours of sound/video works with Keith Rowe, CDs with Yuya Ota, Stephen Vitiello, Emil Schult of Kraftwerk, Don Metz and Rebekkah Palov. His video collaborations include "Yu are the Magic" at City Place - Culture Lab, Palm Beach Florida, The Everson Museum, Syracuse New York, and the Burchfield Penny Art Center. He created electronic music and video projections for Ed Sanders' opera Cassandra.

Footnotes

See also
List of noise musicians
Noise Music
Chip music
Circuit bending
Sonic artifact

References
 Andrew Deutsch bio at Discogs
 Deutsch's home page

External links
Deutsch's website
Forced Exposure Forced Exposure
 viral symphOny
https://www.palmbeachpost.com/entertainment/what-are-those-weird-sounds-inside-the-macy-building-cityplace/4drLNYyQ1otWXw9pfm1kYN/
 Ed Sanders

Alfred University alumni
Alfred University faculty
Rensselaer Polytechnic Institute alumni
Living people
1968 births
American experimental musicians
Experimental composers
American noise musicians
Postmodernists
Pupils of Pauline Oliveros
Male classical composers
20th-century American composers
20th-century American male musicians